is a professional footballer who plays as a defender for J2 League club Fagiano Okayama. He can also play as a defensive midfielder.

Playing career 
Hamada was a member of the United States under-15 squad, as well as Japanese under-17 and under-18 teams. On 10 August 2008, Hamada, along with three others, was promoted to the first team of the Reds. Hamada has been a part of both the US and Japan youth football programs.

Career statistics

Club
Updated to 10 August 2022.

International

Honours

Japan
AFC U-17 Championship (1) : 2006

References

External links
Profile at Avispa Fukuoka 
Profile at Urawa Red Diamonds 

Mizuki Hamada – Yahoo! Japan Sports 

1990 births
Living people
Japanese footballers
Japan youth international footballers
American soccer players
American sportspeople of Japanese descent
J1 League players
J2 League players
Urawa Red Diamonds players
Albirex Niigata players
Avispa Fukuoka players
Fagiano Okayama players
Association football central defenders